Sergey Kolesnikov (born 28 August 1968) is a Russian judoka. He competed in the men's lightweight event at the 1996 Summer Olympics.

References

1968 births
Living people
Russian male judoka
Olympic judoka of Russia
Judoka at the 1996 Summer Olympics
Place of birth missing (living people)